The Critics' Choice Super Award for Best Horror Series is an award presented to the best television series in the horror genre by the Critics Choice Association.

Winners and Nominees 
{| class="wikitable"
|-
! Year !! Series !! Network orPlatform
|-
| rowspan="6"|2021 || style="background:#EEDD82;"|Lovecraft Country || style="background:#EEDD82;"|HBO
|-
| Evil || CBS
|-
| The Haunting of Bly Manor || Netflix
|-
| The Outsider || HBO
|-
| Supernatural || The CW
|-
| The Walking Dead || AMC
|-
| rowspan="6"|2022 || style="background:#EEDD82"|Yellowjackets || style="background:#EEDD82"|Showtime
|-
| Chucky || Syfy/USA Network
|-
| Dr. Death || Peacock
|-
| Evil || Paramount+
|-
| Midnight Mass || Netflix
|-
| Servant || Apple TV+
|-
! colspan="3"|'Best Horror Series, Limited Series or Made-for-TV Movie
|-
| rowspan="6"| 2023 || Chucky || Syfy/USA Network
|-
| Dahmer – Monster: The Jeffrey Dahmer Story || Netflix
|-
|  Interview with the Vampire || rowspan="2" | AMC
|-
| The Walking Dead 
|-
|  Wednesday || Netflix
|-
|  What We Do in the Shadows ||  FX
|-
|}

 Series with multiple nominations 
 Chucky (Syfy/USA Network) – 2
 Evil (CBS/Paramount+) – 2
 The Walking Dead'' (AMC) – 2

References

Broadcast Film Critics Association Awards